Jaime Teevan is an American computer scientist known for her research in human-computer interaction and information retrieval. She is particularly known for the work she has done on personalized search. According to the Technology Review, Teevan "is a leader in using data about people's knowledge, preferences, and habits to help them manage information."

Biography
Teevan received a B.S. in Computer Science from Yale University and a Ph.D. and S.M. from MIT.

She is currently Chief Scientist and a corporate vice president at Microsoft and an affiliate associate professor at the University of Washington.

Previously she was a researcher at Microsoft Research. There she co-authored the first book on collaborative information seeking,. She also edited a book on Personal Information Management (PIM), 
edited a special issue of Communications of the ACM on the topic, and organized workshops on PIM and query log analysis. She has published numerous technical papers, including several best papers, and was chair of the Web Search and Data Mining (WSDM) 2012 conference.

Teevan works on 'microproductivity,' breaking down complex tasks into a series of microtasks that can be completed more easily and efficiently. She also developed the concept of selfsourcing, where microtasks are completed by the task owner rather than crowd workers. A 2017 article in the New York Magazine quotes her as saying, "I could probably pretty easily find an extra hour in my day at work, just in these little micro-moments of time when I’m not being productive."

Awards
Teevan was named a Technology Review (TR35) 2009 Young Innovator for her research on personalized search and received the CRA-W Borg Early Career Award (BECA) in 2014. In 2016 she received the Karen Spärck Jones award from the British Computer Society for her "technically strong and exceptionally creative contributions to the intersection of information retrieval, user experience and social media." In 2022, she was inaugurated as a Microsoft Technical Fellow, and named to the 2022 class of ACM Fellows, "for contributions to human-computer interaction, information retrieval, and productivity".

Personal
Teevan is married to Alexander Hehmeyer.
The couple live in Bellevue, Washington
and have four children.
Teevan is an advocate for helping researchers successfully integrate parenthood and academic efforts.

References

External links
 Professional home page

Information retrieval researchers
Human–computer interaction researchers
American women computer scientists
American computer scientists
Microsoft employees
Living people
Yale University alumni
MIT School of Engineering alumni
University of Washington faculty
1976 births
American women academics
21st-century American women
Microsoft technical fellows
Fellows of the Association for Computing Machinery